Décoration for the Yellow House was the main project Vincent van Gogh focused on in Arles, from August 1888 until his breakdown the day before Christmas. This Décoration had no pre-defined form or size; the central idea of the Décoration grew step by step, with the progress of his work. Starting with the Sunflowers, portraits were included in the next step. Finally, mid-September 1888, the idea took shape: from this time on he concentrated on size 30 canvases (Toiles de 30), which were all meant to form part of this Décoration.

First idea: The Sunflowers, August 1888

Second step: The Portraits, September - October 1888

Third step and definite solution: The Toiles de 30-Décoration, October - December 1888

 For a related project by Van Gogh executed at the same time, in November/December 1888, see The Roulin Family series

Epilogue: The Toiles de 30, January - April 1889

Repetitions

Spring Subjects

Continuation
Later, in Saint-Rémy as well as in Auvers, size 30 canvases form the body of Van Gogh's work, and he continued conceiving series and groups of work based on this size. See The Wheat Field, the Copies by Vincent van Gogh and the Display at Les XX 1890, all from Saint-Rèmy, and the Auvers size 30 canvases.

Resources

Notes

References
 

Paintings of Arles by Vincent van Gogh
1888 paintings
Collections of the Van Gogh Museum